Solenopsis  is a genus of plants in the Campanulaceae. It is native to the Mediterranean region from Portugal and the Canary Islands east to Turkey.

Species
Solenopsis antiphonitis Hadjik. & Hand - Cyprus
Solenopsis balearica (E.Wimm.) Aldasoro & al - Balearic Islands
Solenopsis bicolor (Batt.) Greuter & Burdet - Tunisia, Algeria
Solenopsis bivonae (Tineo) M.B.Crespo, Serra & Juan - Calabria, Sicily, Sardinia, Cyprus
Solenopsis corsica (Meikle) M.B.Crespo, Serra & Juan - Sardinia, Corsica
Solenopsis laurentia (L.) C.Presl - Portugal, Spain, France, Italy, Albania, Greece, Turkey, Lebanon, Syria, Tunisia, Morocco, Algeria, Canary Islands
Solenopsis minuta (L.) C.Presl - Sicily, Sardinia, Crete

References

Lobelioideae
Campanulaceae genera